Saturn's hexagon is a persistent approximately hexagonal cloud pattern around the north pole of the planet Saturn, located at about 78°N.
The hexagon does not shift in longitude like other clouds in the visible atmosphere.

Saturn's hexagon was discovered during the Voyager mission in 1981, and was later revisited by Cassini-Huygens in 2006. During the Cassini mission, the hexagon changed from a mostly blue color to more of a golden color. Saturn's south pole does not have a hexagon, as verified by Hubble observations. It does, however, have a vortex, and there is also a vortex inside the northern hexagon. Multiple hypotheses for the hexagonal cloud pattern have been developed.

Discovery
Saturn's polar hexagon was discovered by David Godfrey in 1987 from piecing together fly-by views from the 1981 Voyager mission,
and was revisited in 2006 by the Cassini mission.

Cassini was able to take only thermal infrared images of the hexagon until it passed into sunlight in January 2009.
Cassini was also able to take a video of the hexagonal weather pattern while traveling at the same speed as the planet, therefore recording only the movement of the hexagon.

After its discovery, and after it came back into the sunlight, amateur astronomers managed to get images showing the hexagon from Earth, even with modest-sized telescopes.

Color

Between 2012 and 2016, the hexagon changed from a mostly blue color to more of a golden color. One theory for this is that sunlight is creating haze as the pole is exposed to sunlight due to the change in season. These changes were observed by the Cassini spacecraft.

Explanations for hexagon shape

One hypothesis, developed at Oxford University, is that the hexagon forms where there is a steep latitudinal gradient in the speed of the atmospheric winds in Saturn's atmosphere. Similar regular shapes were created in the laboratory when a circular tank of liquid was rotated at different speeds at its centre and periphery. The most common shape was six sided, but shapes with three to eight sides were also produced. The shapes form in an area of turbulent flow between the two different rotating fluid bodies with dissimilar speeds. A number of stable vortices of similar size form on the slower (south) side of the fluid boundary and these interact with each other to space themselves out evenly around the perimeter. The presence of the vortices influences the boundary to move northward where each is present and this gives rise to the polygon effect. Polygons do not form at wind boundaries unless the speed differential and viscosity parameters are within certain margins and so are not present at other likely places, such as Saturn's south pole or the poles of Jupiter.

Other researchers claim that lab studies exhibit vortex streets, a series of spiraling vortices not observed in Saturn's hexagon. Simulations show that a shallow, slow, localized meandering jetstream in the same direction as Saturn's prevailing clouds are able to match the observed behaviors of Saturn's hexagon with the same boundary stability.

Developing barotropic instability of Saturn's North Polar hexagonal circumpolar jet (Jet) plus North Polar vortex (NPV) system produces a long-living structure akin to the observed hexagon, which is not the case of the Jet-only system, which was studied in this context in a number of papers in literature. The north polar vortex (NPV), thus, plays a decisive dynamical role to stabilize hexagon jets. The influence of moist convection, which was recently suggested to be at the origin of Saturn's north polar vortex system in the literature, is investigated in the framework of the barotropic rotating shallow water model and does not alter the conclusions.

A 2020 mathematical study at the California Institute of Technology, Andy Ingersoll laboratory found that a stable geometric arrangement of the polygons can occur on any planet when a storm is surrounded by a ring of winds turning in the opposite direction to the storms itself, called an anticyclonic ring, or anticyclonic shielding. Such shielding creates a vorticity gradient in the background of a neighbor cyclone, causing mutual rejection between the cyclones (similar to the effect of beta-drift). Although apparently shielded, the polar cyclone on Saturn cannot hold a polygonal pattern of circumpolar cyclones such as Jupiter's due to the bigger size and slower wind speed of Saturn's polar cyclone.

See also
Titanian polar vortices

References

External links

 
 Saturn Revolution 175, Cassini images, November 27, 2012
 Saturn’s Strange Hexagon – In Living Color! – Universe Today
 Edge of the hexagon from Planetary Photojournal
 Saturn's Hexagon Comes to Light, APOD January 22, 2012
 In the Center of Saturn's North Polar Vortex, Astronomy Picture of the Day – December 4, 2012
 Video of hexagon's rotation from NASA
 NASA's Cassini Spacecraft Obtains Best Views of Saturn Hexagon (December 4, 2013)
 Animated vortex view (TPS)
 Hexagon image
 Saturn's Hexagon Replicated In Laboratory, video
 Hexagon Changes Color (October 21, 2016)

Saturn
Planetary spots